This is an alphabetical list of cricketers who played for Loughborough Lightning during their existence between 2016 and 2019. They competed in the Women's Cricket Super League, a Twenty20 competition, during these years before being replaced by Lightning as part of a restructure of English women's domestic cricket.

Players' names are followed by the years in which they were active as a Loughborough Lightning player. Seasons given are first and last seasons; the player did not necessarily play in all the intervening seasons. This list only includes players who appeared in at least one match for Loughborough Lightning; players who were named in the team's squad for a season but did not play a match are not included.

A
 Georgia Adams (2018–2019)
 Chamari Atapattu (2019)

B
 Kristen Beams (2017)
 Thea Brookes (2016–2017)
 Kathryn Bryce (2019)

D
 Sophie Devine (2016–2018)
 Mignon du Preez (2019)

E
 Georgia Elwiss (2016–2019)

F
 Abigail Freeborn (2017–2019)

G
 Jo Gardner (2018–2019)
 Sarah Glenn (2017–2019)
 Kirstie Gordon (2018–2019)
 Rebecca Grundy (2016–2017)
 Jenny Gunn (2018–2019)

H
 Rachael Haynes (2018)
 Lucy Higham (2017–2019)

J
 Amy Jones (2016–2019)
 Evelyn Jones (2016)

K
 Marie Kelly (2017)

L
 Beth Langston (2016–2017)

M
 Hayley Matthews (2019)

N
 Tara Norris (2019)

O
 Sonia Odedra (2016–2017)

P
 Ellyse Perry (2016–2017)

S
 Paige Scholfield (2016–2017)
 Linsey Smith (2018)

V
 Dane van Niekerk (2016)
 Elyse Villani (2017–2018)

Captains

See also
 List of Lightning (women's cricket) cricketers

References

Loughborough Lightning (women's cricket)